Elfvin is a surname. Notable people with the surname include:

 Bayard Elfvin (born 1981), American soccer player
 John T. Elfvin (1917–2009), American lawyer and jurist
 Monica Elfvin (born 1938), Swedish gymnast